Dead and Alive or Dead & Alive may refer to:

Dead and Alive (Koontz novel), 2009 novel by Dean Koontz
Dead and Alive (Simonov novel), 1959 novel by Konstantin Simonov
Dead and Alive (Innes novel), 1946 novel by Hammond Innes
Dead & Alive (Doug Anthony All Stars album) (1993)
Dead & Alive (The Devil Wears Prada album) (2012)
Schrödinger's cat, a thought experiment from quantum mechanics with a cat that may be simultaneously both alive and dead

See also

  or 
  or 

 Dead Alive (disambiguation)
 Dead or Alive (disambiguation)
 The Alive and the Dead a 1964 film